XHPJMM-FM is a radio station on 93.3 FM in José María Morelos, Quintana Roo. It is owned by Song Comunicaciones and carries a pop format known as Presumida FM.

History
XHPJMM was awarded in the IFT-4 radio auction of 2017 and came to air in March 2018. Corpulenta Operadora is owned by Lizbeth Loy Song Escalada, a former Quintana Roo state judge, and her daughter Lizbeth Loy Gamboa Song, a former federal deputy.

References

External links

Radio stations in Quintana Roo
Radio stations established in 2018
2018 establishments in Mexico